Mark Douglas Mullet (born August 14, 1972) is an American businessman and politician of the Democratic Party. He is a member of the Washington State Senate, representing the 5th Legislative District.

Mullet, after more than 12 years in international finance at Bank of America, became a small business owner who owns Zeeks Pizza and Ben and Jerry's Ice Cream franchises in Issaquah.

Early life
His father was Steve Mullet, a former Mayor of Tukwila, Washington from 2000-2007.

Mullet is a graduate of Foster High School.  He earned a B.S. in Finance from Indiana University, and a Master's in Public Affairs from the Evans School at the University of Washington in 2008.  Mullet was the Washington High School State Tennis Champion in 1989 and 1990.

Career 
Mullet is a small business owner, owning Zeek's Pizza and Ben and Jerry’s Ice Cream franchises in the Issaquah and Sammamish area. Mullet had previously served as a Managing Director at Bank of America, serving as the Global Head of Foreign Currency Options Trading.

Before being elected to the state senate, Mullet served as a member of the Issaquah City Council, from  2009–2012.  Mullet names Grand Ridge Plaza, a mixed-use retail center, and a plastic bag ban as his key accomplishments while on city council.

Elections 
In 2012, Mullet was elected state senator representing Washington's 5th Legislative District by a 54.31% to 45.38% majority over his opponent Brad Toft.

Committee assignments 
As of January 2019, Mullet is the Chair of the Financial Institutions, Economic Development and Trade Committee as well as a member of the Early Learning & K-12 Education Committee and Ways and Means Committee.

Legislation
Mullet sponsored and passed legislation increasing access to epi pens in schools, allowing annexation of the Maple Valley Donut Hole, and increasing health care cost transparency.

Mullet helped secure capital funding for projects throughout the 5th Legislative District, including: Lake Sammamish State Park improvements, road improvements on I-90 and the Pickering Place Retail Center, improvements at Camp Korey, a grant for the Railway History Museum in Snoqualmie, repairs at the Fire Training Academy in North Bend, and funding to help build a new Tahoma High School within Maple Valley.

Mullet sponsored SB 5476, a bill allowing farms to extract 120 hours per year of overtime labor from their workers before paying overtime wages.

Awards 
 2021 City Champion Awards. Presented by Association of Washington Cities (AWC).

References

External links
 Washington State Legislature: Senate Website
 2020 Roll Call Votes (official record)
 2021 Roll Call Votes (official record)
 Older records via archive.org 
 Washington Senate Democrats Website: Mark Mullet
 2020 Election Campaign Website
 Voting Record by Vote Smart

Democratic Party Washington (state) state senators
Living people
1972 births
21st-century American politicians
People from Tukwila, Washington